Mylothra pyrrhella is a moth of the family Autostichidae. It is found in Turkey.

The wingspan is 19–20 mm. It is similar to Symmoca straminella, but the forewing has a fine orange tint.

References

Moths described in 1895
Mylothra
Insects of Turkey